Brian Richard Gaskill (born January 22, 1970 in Honolulu, Hawaii, raised in Neptune Township, New Jersey) is an American actor.

Career
While living in Neptune, he attended Red Bank Regional High School as a drama major in the school's Academy of Visual and Performing Arts. He went on to receive his B.F.A. from the acting conservatory at State University of New York at Purchase.

His television debut was in the series Models Inc. in 1994. In 1995, he was cast as Bobby Warner in the soap opera All My Children, on which he appeared until 1997.

In 2001 he appeared in the role as angel/vampire hunter Rafe Kovich on the General Hospital spinoff Port Charles.  He continued with the role until the show was canceled in 2003.

After Port Charles was canceled, he appeared as Oscar Marone on The Bold and the Beautiful from 2003 to 2004.

From September 2005 to December 2005, Gaskill briefly joined the cast of As the World Turns as B.J. Green.  Gaskill and his wife, Tonya Watts, welcomed their first child, Alabama Zoe, on September 26, 2005.

In March 2007, Gaskill joined the cast of Guiding Light as a recast of Dylan Lewis, the son of Reva Shayne and Billy Lewis and the estranged father of Daisy Lemay.

Lately Brian has also been directing music videos; including one for Georgette Jones that included her legendary father George Jones, and one for Americana/Rock/Blues artist Anne McCue called "don't go to Texas (without me). The later video made it into the top ten in 2010 on Logo; an MTV subsidiary.

Filmography

See also
Rafe Kovich and Alison Barrington

References

External links

Brian Gaskill profile on Soap Opera Central

1970 births
Living people
Male actors from Honolulu
People from Neptune Township, New Jersey
Red Bank Regional High School alumni
American male soap opera actors
State University of New York at Purchase alumni